USS Recovery (ARS-43) was a Bolster-class rescue and salvage ship of the United States Navy, which remained in commission for over 48 years.

Laid down on 6 January 1945 by the Basalt Rock Company in Napa, California, the ship was  launched on 4 August 1945, sponsored by Mrs. Harry Burris, and commissioned on 15 May 1946.

Service history

1946–1960
Following shakedown, Recovery operated briefly out of San Diego, then on 9 August got underway for the Panama Canal Zone. Homeported at Naval Station Rodman from her arrival on 30 August, until September 1953, the ship performed salvage, repair, and towing operations in the Canal Zone and the Caribbean; provided men and equipment for underwater projects of the Army Engineers; served as a training ship for Naval Reservists of the 15th Naval District; and, after April 1952, added a second-class diving school to her duties. Transferred to the east coast in October 1953, Recovery arrived at her new homeport, Norfolk, Virginia, on the 11th only to depart soon after for her first tour in northern latitudes in support of MSTS North Atlantic and Arctic resupply programs. She arrived at Goose Bay on 3 November and operated off Labrador, Newfoundland, and Nova Scotia into the new year, returning to Norfolk on 29 January 1954.

In addition to annual deployments to subarctic and arctic waters to support Military Sea Transportation Service operations over the next seven years, Recovery's mobile ability to provide salvage, repair, towing, diving, and rescue services to the fleet was utilized along the lengths of the Atlantic and Gulf coasts and in the Caribbean as well as in the Chesapeake Bay area. Occasionally assigned to experimental programs, in 1960 she assisted in shock test programs at Key West and in the Bahamas and in escape and recovery tests off the Virginia coast for the National Aeronautical and Space Administration's man-in-space program. That year she also provided disaster relief for the outer islands of the Bahamas in the wake of Hurricane Donna.

1961–1970
In February 1961 the Arctic came to Chesapeake Bay and Recovery assisted Coast Guard vessels in clearing heavy ice congestion and aiding stranded merchantmen. In May she again operated in support of NASA's space program and directed offshore standby recovery forces during Commander Shepard's suborbital flight, America's first manned space flight. In July Recovery returned to Cape Canaveral and joined the support force for Major Grissom's suborbital flight. Between August and November she supported the Arctic resupply program; then, in 1962, provided target towing service before returning to Florida for Lieutenant Colonel Glenn's February orbital mission.

East coast and Caribbean operations occupied the remainder of the year and in 1963 she added oceanographic survey work to her duties. First on the scene, she recovered samples of oil and grease, plastic, and styrofoam.

In July 1964 Recovery returned from her last oceanographic mission and her survey equipment was removed. In September she sailed to Scotland to participate in exercise "Teamwork", thence proceeded to Spain for "Steel Pike", the largest peacetime amphibious operation. In November she returned to the United States and resumed duty out of Norfolk. In 1967 she again sailed north for extended operations in northern latitudes, returning to Norfolk in October, after a good will visit to Montreal, Quebec, Canada. Three months later, in January 1968, she again assisted with shock tests at Key West; then, until July, was engaged primarily in towing operations. On 25 July she deployed, for the first time, to the Mediterranean, where for the next seven months she provided salvage, repair, diving, and towing services to the 6th Fleet. She returned to Norfolk in mid-February 1969 and resumed operations along the eastern seaboard and in the Caribbean, continuing such operations in that area into 1970.

1970–1994
In late January 1970, she steamed out of Little Creek, Virginia, for a deployment in the Mediterranean. By 18 July, she had returned to normal operations along the Atlantic seaboard and in the Caribbean. Recovery continued in this employment until 4 August 1971, at which time she embarked on her third Mediterranean cruise. Seven months later she returned to Little Creek, Virginia, and engaged in normal operations along the east coast.

Lieutenant Commander Kathleen A. McGrath commanded the ship in 1993 and 1994.  Commander McGrath was the first woman to command a ship in the US Navy.

Decommissioning and transfer
Recovery was decommissioned and simultaneously struck from the Naval Vessel Register on 30 September 1994. She was transferred to Taiwan on 30 September 1998, under the Security Assistance Program, and commissioned on 1 March 1999 in the Republic of China Navy as ROCS Da Juen (ARS-556), where she remains in commission under the name Ta De (ARS-556).

References

External links
 
  Basalt Rock Company Shipbuilding History

 

Bolster-class rescue and salvage ships
Ships built in Napa, California
1945 ships
World War II auxiliary ships of the United States
Cold War auxiliary ships of the United States
Ships transferred from the United States Navy to the Republic of China Navy
Auxiliary ships of the Republic of China Navy